Pallacanestro Forlì 2.015, also known as simply Forlì, is an Italian basketball club based in Forlì. Established in 2015, it plays its home games at the Unieuro Arena. The club currently plays in the Serie A2 Basket, the second tier league of Italy.

History
The club was established in May 2015 to fill up the gap which was left after Fulgor Libertas Forlì was dissolved. Forlì 2.015 started playing in the Serie B Basket, Italy's third tier league. In its first season, Unieuro Forli won the Serie B LNP Cup after defeating Eurobasket Roma in the final.6 In the same season, Forlì managed to promote to the Serie A2 Basket.

Honours
Serie B LNP Cup
Winners (1): 2016

Current roster

Notable players
Maurice Watson (born 1993), American basketball player for Maccabi Rishon LeZion of the Israeli Basketball Premier League
Kalin Lucas (born 1989), American basketball player for Forlì currently, has played in the NBA

References

External links
Official website

Basketball teams in Emilia-Romagna
Basketball teams established in 2015
Sport in Forlì